Rajan Paranja Kadha is a 1978 Indian Malayalam film, directed by Mani Swamy and produced by Mani M. K. The film stars Kaviyoor Ponnamma, Jose Prakash, Sankaradi and Sukumaran in the lead roles. The film has musical score by G. Devarajan.

Cast

Sukumaran 
M. G. Soman
Janardhanan (actor)
Kaviyoor Ponnamma 
Jose Prakash 
Sankaradi 
Aboobacker 
Abu Salim

Soundtrack
The music was composed by G. Devarajan and the lyrics were written by P. Bhaskaran.

References

External links
 

1978 films
1970s Malayalam-language films